Francis Lyon may refer to:

 Francis D. Lyon (1905–1996), American film editor
 Francis Lyon (footballer) (1895–1964), Australian footballer
 Francis Strother Lyon (1800–1882), American and Confederate States politician

See also
Frances Bowes-Lyon, Countess of Strathmore and Kinghorne (1832–1922), British noblewoman
Francis Lyons (disambiguation)

Lyon (disambiguation)